Kakatiya architecture of 1052–1323 CE was a notable Vesara temple building architecture developed during the rule of the Kakatiya dynasty 1163–1323 CE, in the region known today as eastern Deccan comprising Telangana and Andhra Pradesh states of India. The Kakatiya architecture is more significant in Hanamakonda — their first capital and Warangal being their second capital.

Most of the Kakatiya architecture is influenced from Chalukya architecture a fusion of Dravidian architecture and Nagara Bhumija styles in which sandbox technology is used to construct  Vimana—horizontal stepped tower. There are hundreds of monuments in the core of Hanamakonda and Warangal of which Thousand Pillar Temple, Ramappa Temple, Ramappa Lake, Warangal Fort and Kota Gullu are prominent, among which Ramappa Temple, also known as the Rudreshwara temple, is a UNESCO World Heritage Site located in Mulugu,  from Warangal,  from Hyderabad.

Temple architecture 

Depending on the geographical location the Kakatiya's used both stones and bricks for the construction of temple complexes, there temple plans are of five main designs; 1) Ekakuta 2) Dwikuta 3) TriKuta 4) Chatuskuta and 5) Panchakuta, depending on its geographical alliangment all the main temples are facing east, towards the rising sun following the Vastu shastra. Some of the temples premises also consist of Sabha Mandapa, the Nandi Mandapa, Pakashala, kalyana mandapa, ranga mandapa and dwara mandapa.

See also
 Architecture of India
 Vijayanagara architecture

Notes

External links

ASI set to survey Kakatiya temples, Deccan Chronicle, by;J V Siva Prasanna Kumar, Published; 11 December 2016
Southern India, by George Michell 2012
Seeing Spiritual India: A Guide to Temples, Holy Sites, Festivals and Traditions, by Stephen Knapp 2008
Kakatiya architecture.
Ramappa Temple
The Glorious Kakatiya Temples and Gateways

Indian architectural styles
Indian architectural history
Kakatiya architecture